is a former Japanese football player.

Club statistics

References

External links

1982 births
Living people
University of Tsukuba alumni
Association football people from Kanagawa Prefecture
Japanese footballers
J1 League players
J2 League players
Kashiwa Reysol players
FC Tokyo players
Tokushima Vortis players
Association football forwards